Transubstantiation (Latin: transubstantiatio; Greek: μετουσίωσις metousiosis) is, according to the teaching of the Catholic Church, "the change of the whole substance of bread into the substance of the Body of Christ and of the whole substance of wine into the substance of the Blood of Christ". This change is brought about in the eucharistic prayer through the efficacy of the word of Christ and by the action of the Holy Spirit. However, "the outward characteristics of bread and wine, that is the 'eucharistic species', remain unaltered". In this teaching, the notions of "substance" and "transubstantiation" are not linked with any particular theory of metaphysics.

The Roman Catholic Church teaches that, in the Eucharistic offering, bread and wine are changed into the body and blood of Christ. The affirmation of this doctrine was expressed, using the word "transubstantiate", by the Fourth Council of the Lateran in 1215. It was later challenged by various 14th-century reformers, John Wycliffe in particular. 

The manner in which the change occurs, the Roman Catholic Church teaches, is a mystery: "The signs of bread and wine become, in a way surpassing understanding, the Body and Blood of Christ." In Anglicanism, the precise terminology to be used to refer to the nature of the Eucharist has a contentious interpretation: "bread and cup" or "Body and Blood"; "set before" or "offer"; "objective change" or "new significance".

In the Greek Orthodox Church, the doctrine has been discussed under the term of metousiosis, coined as a direct loan-translation of transubstantiatio in the 17th century. In Eastern Orthodoxy in general, the Sacred Mystery (Sacrament) of the Eucharist is more commonly discussed using alternative terms such as "trans-elementation" (metastoicheiosis), "re-ordination" (metarrhythmisis), or simply "change" (metabole).

History

Summary 
From the earliest centuries, the Church spoke of the elements used in celebrating the Eucharist as being changed into the body and blood of Christ. Terms used to speak of the alteration included "trans-elementation." The bread and wine were said to be "made", "changed into", the body and blood of Christ. Similarly, Augustine said: "Not all bread, but only that which receives the blessing of Christ becomes the body of Christ."

The term "transubstantiation" was used at least by the 11th century to speak of the change and was in widespread use by the 12th century. The Fourth Council of the Lateran used it in 1215. When later theologians adopted Aristotelian metaphysics in Western Europe, they explained the change that was already part of Catholic teaching in terms of Aristotelian substance and accidents. The sixteenth-century Reformation gave this as a reason for rejecting the Catholic teaching. The Council of Trent did not impose the Aristotelian theory of substance and accidents or the term "transubstantiation" in its Aristotelian meaning, but stated that the term is a fitting and proper term for the change that takes place by consecration of the bread and wine. The term, which for that Council had no essential dependence on scholastic ideas, is used in the Catholic Church to affirm the fact of Christ's presence and the mysterious and radical change which takes place, but not to explain how the change takes place, since this occurs "in a way surpassing understanding". The term is mentioned in both the 1992 and 1997 editions of the Catechism of the Catholic Church and is given prominence in the later (2005) Compendium of the Catechism of the Catholic Church.

Patristic period

Early Christian writers referred to the Eucharistic elements as Jesus's body and the blood. The short document known as the Teachings of the Apostles or Didache, which may be the earliest Christian document outside of the New Testament to speak of the Eucharist, says, "Let no one eat or drink of your Eucharist, unless they have been baptized into the name of the Lord; for concerning this also the Lord has said, 'Give not that which is holy to the dogs'."

Ignatius of Antioch, writing in about AD 106 to the Roman Christians, says: "I desire the bread of God, the heavenly bread, the bread of life, which is the flesh of Jesus Christ, the Son of God, who became afterwards of the seed of David and Abraham; and I desire the drink of God, namely His blood, which is incorruptible love and eternal life."

Writing to the Christians of Smyrna in the same year, he warned them to "stand aloof from such heretics", because, among other reasons, "they abstain from the Eucharist and from prayer, because they confess not the Eucharist to be the flesh of our Saviour Jesus Christ, which suffered for our sins, and which the Father, of His goodness, raised up again."

In about 150, Justin Martyr, referring to the Eucharist, wrote: "Not as common bread and common drink do we receive these; but in like manner as Jesus Christ our Savior, having been made flesh by the Word of God, had both flesh and blood for our salvation, so likewise have we been taught that the food which is blessed by the prayer of His word, and from which our blood and flesh by transmutation are nourished, is the flesh and blood of that Jesus who was made flesh."

In about AD 200, Tertullian wrote: "Having taken the bread and given it to His disciples, He made it His own body, by saying, This is my body, that is, the figure of my body. A figure, however, there could not have been, unless there were first a veritable body. An empty thing, or phantom, is incapable of a figure. If, however, (as Marcion might say) He pretended the bread was His body, because He lacked the truth of bodily substance, it follows that He must have given bread for us."

The Apostolic Constitutions (compiled ) says: "Let the bishop give the oblation, saying, The body of Christ; and let him that receiveth say, Amen. And let the deacon take the cup; and when he gives it, say, The blood of Christ, the cup of life; and let him that drinketh say, Amen."

Ambrose of Milan (died 397) wrote:

Other fourth-century Christian writers say that in the Eucharist there occurs a "change", "transelementation", "transformation", "transposing", "alteration" of the bread into the body of Christ.

Augustine declares that the bread consecrated in the Eucharist actually "becomes" (in Latin, fit) the Body of Christ: "The faithful know what I'm talking about; they know Christ in the breaking of bread. It isn't every loaf of bread, you see, but the one receiving Christ's blessing, that becomes the body of Christ."

Clement of Alexandria, who uses the word "symbol" concerning the Eucharist, is quoted as an exception, although this interpretation is disputed on the basis of Alexandrian overlaps of symbology and literalism.

Middle Ages

Paschasius Radbertus (785–865) was a Carolingian theologian, and the abbot of Corbie, whose most well-known and influential work is an exposition on the nature of the Eucharist written around 831, entitled De Corpore et Sanguine Domini. In it, Paschasius agrees with Ambrose in affirming that the Eucharist contains the true, historical body of Jesus Christ. According to Paschasius, God is truth itself, and therefore, his words and actions must be true.  Christ's proclamation at the Last Supper that the bread and wine were his body and blood must be taken literally, since God is truth.  He thus believes that the change of the substances of the bread and wine into the body and blood of Christ offered in the Eucharist really occurs.  Only if the Eucharist is the actual body and blood of Christ can a Christian know it is salvific. 

In the 11th century, Berengar of Tours stirred up opposition when he denied that any material change in the elements was needed to explain the fact of the Real Presence. His position was never diametrically opposed to that of his critics, and he was probably never excommunicated, but the controversies that he aroused (see Stercoranism) forced people to clarify the doctrine of the Eucharist.

The earliest known use of the term transubstantiation to describe the change from bread and wine to body and blood of Christ in the Eucharist was by Hildebert de Lavardin, Archbishop of Tours, in the 11th century. By the end of the 12th century the term was in widespread use.

The Fourth Council of the Lateran in 1215 spoke of the bread and wine as "transubstantiated" into the body and blood of Christ: "His body and blood are truly contained in the sacrament of the altar under the forms of bread and wine, the bread and wine having been transubstantiated, by God's power, into his body and blood". Catholic scholars and clergy have noted numerous reports of Eucharistic miracles contemporary with the council, and at least one such report was discussed at the council. It was not until later in the 13th century that Aristotelian metaphysics was accepted and a philosophical elaboration in line with that metaphysics was developed, which found classic formulation in the teaching of Thomas Aquinas and in the theories of later Catholic theologians in the medieval period (Robert Grosseteste, Giles of Rome, Duns Scotus and William of Ockham).<ref>[http://digitalcommons.unl.edu/cgi/viewcontent.cgi?article=1126&context=classicsfacpub  Stephen E. Lahey, "Review of Adams, Some later medieval theories ..." in The Journal of Ecclesiastical History, vol. 63, issue 1 (January 2012)]</ref>

Reformation
During the Protestant Reformation, the doctrine of transubstantiation was heavily criticised as an Aristotelian "pseudophilosophy" imported into Christian teaching and jettisoned in favor of Martin Luther's doctrine of sacramental union, or in favor, per Huldrych Zwingli, of the Eucharist as memorial.

In the Protestant Reformation, the doctrine of transubstantiation became a matter of much controversy. Martin Luther held that "It is not the doctrine of transubstantiation which is to be believed, but simply that Christ really is present at the Eucharist". In his On the Babylonian Captivity of the Church (published on 6 October 1520) Luther wrote:

In his 1528 Confession Concerning Christ's Supper, he wrote:

What Luther thus called a "sacramental union" is often erroneously called "consubstantiation" by non-Lutherans. In On the Babylonian Captivity, Luther upheld belief in the Real Presence of Jesus and, in his 1523 treatise The Adoration of the Sacrament, defended adoration of the body and blood of Christ in the Eucharist.

In the Six Articles of 1539, the death penalty is specifically prescribed for any who denied transubstantiation.

This was changed under Elizabeth I. In the 39 articles of 1563, the Church of England declared: "Transubstantiation (or the change of the substance of Bread and Wine) in the Supper of the Lord, cannot be proved by holy Writ; but is repugnant to the plain words of Scripture, overthroweth the nature of a Sacrament, and hath given occasion to many superstitions". Laws were enacted against participation in Catholic worship, which remained illegal until 1791.

For a century and half – 1672 to 1828 – transubstantiation had an important role, in a negative way, in British political and social life. Under the Test Act, the holding of any public office was made conditional upon explicitly denying Transubstantiation. Any aspirant to public office had to repeat the formula set out by the law: "I, N, do declare that I do believe that there is not any transubstantiation in the sacrament of the Lord's Supper, or in the elements of the bread and wine, at or after the consecration thereof by any person whatsoever."

Council of Trent
In 1551, the Council of Trent declared that the doctrine of transubstantiation is a dogma of faith and stated that "by the consecration of the bread and wine there takes place a change of the whole substance of the bread into the substance of the body of Christ our Lord and of the whole substance of the wine into the substance of his blood. This change the holy Catholic Church has fittingly and properly called transubstantiation."
In its 13th session ending 11 October 1551, the Council defined transubstantiation as "that wonderful and singular conversion of the whole substance of the bread into the Body, and of the whole substance of the wine into the Blood – the species only of the bread and wine remaining – which conversion indeed the Catholic Church most aptly calls Transubstantiation". This council officially approved use of the term "transubstantiation" to express the Catholic Church's teaching on the subject of the conversion of the bread and wine into the body and blood of Christ in the Eucharist, with the aim of safeguarding Christ's presence as a literal truth, while emphasizing the fact that there is no change in the empirical appearances of the bread and wine. It did not however impose the Aristotelian theory of substance and accidents: it spoke only of the species (the appearances), not the philosophical term "accidents", and the word "substance" was in ecclesiastical use for many centuries before Aristotelian philosophy was adopted in the West, as shown for instance by its use in the Nicene Creed which speaks of Christ having the same "" (Greek) or "" (Latin) as the Father.

 Since the Second Vatican Council 

The Catechism of the Catholic Church states the Church's teaching on transubstantiation twice.

It repeats what it calls the Council of Trent's summary of the Catholic faith on "the conversion of the bread and wine into Christ's body and blood [by which] Christ becomes present in this sacrament", faith "in the efficacy of the Word of Christ and of the action of the Holy Spirit to bring about this conversion": "[B]y the consecration of the bread and wine there takes place a change of the whole substance of the bread into the substance of the body of Christ our Lord and of the whole substance of the wine into the substance of his blood. This change the holy Catholic Church has fittingly and properly called transubstantiation".

As part of its own summary ("In brief") of the Catechism of the Catholic Church on the sacrament of the Eucharist, it states: "By the consecration the transubstantiation of the bread and wine into the Body and Blood of Christ is brought about. Under the consecrated species of bread and wine Christ himself, living and glorious, is present in a true, real, and substantial manner: his Body and his Blood, with his soul and his divinity (cf. Council of Trent: DS 1640; 1651)."

The Church's teaching is given in the Compendium of the Catechism of the Catholic Church in question and answer form:

The Anglican–Roman Catholic Joint Preparatory Commission stated in 1971 in their common declaration on Eucharistic doctrine: "The word transubstantiation is commonly used in the Roman Catholic Church to indicate that God acting in the eucharist effects a change in the inner reality of the elements."

 Opinions of some individuals (not necessarily typical) 
In 2017 Irish Augustinian Gabriel Daly said that the Council of Trent approved use of the term "transubstantiation" as suitable and proper, but did not make it obligatory, and he suggested that its continued use is partly to blame for lack of progress towards sharing of the Eucharist between Protestants and Catholics.

Traditionalist Catholic Paolo Pasqualucci said that the absence of the term in the Second Vatican Council's constitution on the liturgy Sacrosanctum Concilium means that it presents the Catholic Mass "in the manner of the Protestants". To this Dave Armstrong replied that "the word may not be present; but the concept is". For instance, the document Gaudium et Spes refers to the "sacrament of faith where natural elements refined by man are gloriously changed into His Body and Blood, providing a meal of brotherly solidarity and a foretaste of the heavenly banquet" (Chapter 3).

Thomas J. Reese commented that "using Aristotelian concepts to explain Catholic mysteries in the 21st century is a fool's errand", while Timothy O'Malley remarked that "it is possible to teach the doctrine of transubstantiation without using the words 'substance' and 'accidents'. If the word 'substance' scares people off, you can say, 'what it really is', and that is what substance is. What it really is, what it absolutely is at its heart is Christ's body and blood".

 General belief and doctrine knowledge among Catholics 
A Georgetown University CARA poll of United States Catholics in 2008 showed that 57% said they believed that Jesus Christ is really present in the Eucharist in 2008 and nearly 43% said that they believed the wine and bread are symbols of Jesus. Of those attending Mass weekly or more often, 91% believed in the Real Presence, as did 65% of those who merely attended at least once a month, and 40% of those who attended at most a few times a year.

Among Catholics attending Mass at least once a month, the percentage of belief in the Real Presence was 86% for pre-Vatican II Catholics, 74% for Vatican II Catholics, 75% for post-Vatican II Catholics, and 85% for Millennials.

A 2019 Pew Research Report found that 69% of United States Catholics believed that in the Eucharist the bread and wine "are symbols of the body and blood of Jesus Christ", and only 31% believed that, "during Catholic Mass, the bread and wine actually become the body and blood of Jesus". Of the latter group, most (28% of all US Catholics) said they knew that this is what the Church teaches, while the remaining 3% said they did not know it. Of the 69% who said the bread and wine are symbols, almost two-thirds (43% of all Catholics) said that what they believed is the Church's teaching, 22% said that they believed it in spite of knowing that the Church teaches that the bread and wine actually become the body and blood of Christ. Among United States Catholics who attend Mass at least once a week, the most observant group, 63% accepted that the bread and wine actually become the body and blood of Christ; the other 37% saw the bread and wine as symbols, most of them (23%) not knowing that the Church, so the survey stated, teaches that the elements actually become the body and blood of Christ, while the remaining 14% rejected what was given as the Church's teaching. The Pew Report presented "the understanding that the bread and wine used in Communion are symbols of the body and blood of Jesus Christ" as contradicting belief that, “during Catholic Mass, the bread and wine actually become the body and blood of Jesus”. The Catholic Church itself speaks of the bread and wine used in Communion both as "signs" and as "becoming" Christ's body and blood: "[...] the signs of bread and wine become, in a way surpassing understanding, the Body and Blood of Christ".

In a comment on the Pew Research Report, Greg Erlandson drew attention to the difference between the formulation in the CARA survey, in which the choice was between "Jesus Christ is really present in the bread and wine of the Eucharist" and "the bread and wine are symbols of Jesus, but Jesus is not really present", and the Pew Research choice between "during Catholic Mass, the bread and wine actually become the body and blood of Jesus" and "the bread wine are symbols of the body and blood of Jesus Christ". He quotes an observation by Mark Gray that the word "actually" makes it sound like "something that could be analyzed under a microscope or empirically observed", while what the Church teaches is that the "substance" of the bread and wine are changed at consecration, but the "accidents" or appearances of bread and wine remain. Erlandson commented further: "Catholics may not be able to articulately define the 'Real Presence', and the  'transubstantiation' may be obscure to them, but in their reverence and demeanor, they demonstrate their belief that this is not just a symbol".

Theology

Catholic Church

While the Catholic doctrine of transubstantiation in relation to the Eucharist can be viewed in terms of the Aristotelian distinction between substance and accident, Catholic theologians generally hold that, "in referring to the Eucharist, the Church does not use the terms substance and accident in their philosophical contexts but in the common and ordinary sense in which they were first used many centuries ago. The dogma of transubstantiation does not embrace any philosophical theory in particular." This ambiguity is recognized also by a Lutheran theologian such as Jaroslav Pelikan, who, while himself interpreting the terms as Aristotelian, states that "the application of the term 'substance' to the discussion of the Eucharistic presence antedates the rediscovery of Aristotle. [...] Even 'transubstantiation' was used during the twelfth century in a nontechnical sense. Such evidence lends credence to the argument that the doctrine of transubstantiation, as codified by the decrees of the Fourth Lateran and Tridentine councils, did not canonize Aristotelian philosophy as indispensable to Christian doctrine. But whether it did so or not in principle, it has certainly done so in effect".

The view that the distinction is independent of any philosophical theory has been expressed as follows: "The distinction between substance and accidents is real, not just imaginary. In the case of the person, the distinction between the person and his or her accidental features is after all real. Therefore, even though the notion of substance and accidents originated from Aristotelian philosophy, the distinction between substance and accidents is also independent of philosophical and scientific development." "Substance" here means what something is in itself: take some concrete object – e.g. your own hat. The shape is not the object itself, nor is its color, size, softness to the touch, nor anything else about it perceptible to the senses. The object itself (the "substance") has the shape, the color, the size, the softness and the other appearances, but is distinct from them. While the appearances are perceptible to the senses, the substance is not.

The philosophical term "accidents" does not appear in the teaching of the Council of Trent on transubstantiation, which is repeated in the Catechism of the Catholic Church. For what the Council distinguishes from the "substance" of the bread and wine it uses the term species:

The Catechism of the Catholic Church cites the Council of Trent also in regard to the mode of the real presence of Christ in the Eucharist:

The Catholic Church holds that the same change of the substance of the bread and of the wine at the Last Supper continues to occur at the consecration of the Eucharist when the words are spoken in persona Christi "This is my body ... this is my blood." In Orthodox confessions, the change is said to start during the Dominical or Lord's Words or Institution Narrative and be completed during the Epiklesis.

Teaching that Christ is risen from the dead and is alive, the Catholic Church holds, in addition to the doctrine of transubstantiation, that when the bread is changed into his body, not only his body is present, but Christ as a whole is present ("the body and blood, together with the soul and divinity"). The same holds when the wine is transubstantiated into the blood of Christ. This is known as the doctrine of concomitance.

In accordance with the dogmatic teaching that Christ is really, truly and substantially present under the appearances of bread and wine, and continues to be present as long as those appearances remain, the Catholic Church preserves the consecrated elements, generally in a church tabernacle, for administering Holy Communion to the sick and dying.

In the arguments which characterised the relationship between Roman Catholicism and Protestantism in the 16th century, the Council of Trent declared subject to the ecclesiastical penalty of anathema anyone who

The Catholic Church asserts that the consecrated bread and wine are not merely "symbols" of the body and blood of Christ: they are the body and blood of Christ. It also declares that, although the bread and wine completely cease to be bread and wine (having become the body and blood of Christ), the appearances (the "species" or look) remain unchanged, and the properties of the appearances also remain (one can be drunk with the appearance of wine despite it only being an appearance). They are still the appearances of bread and wine, not of Christ, and do not inhere in the substance of Christ. They can be felt and tasted as before, and are subject to change and can be destroyed. If the appearance of bread is lost by turning to dust or the appearance of wine is lost by turning to vinegar, Christ is no longer present.

The essential signs of the Eucharistic sacrament are wheat bread and grape wine, on which the blessing of the Holy Spirit is invoked and the priest pronounces the words of consecration spoken by Jesus during the Last Supper: "This is my body which will be given up for you. ... This is the cup of my blood ..." When the signs cease to exist, so does the sacrament.

According to Catholic teaching, the whole of Christ, body and blood, soul and divinity, is really, truly and substantially in the sacrament, under each of the appearances of bread and wine, but he is not in the sacrament as in a place and is not moved when the sacrament is moved. He is perceptible neither by the sense nor by the imagination, but only by the intellectual eye.

St. Thomas Aquinas gave poetic expression to this perception in the devotional hymn Adoro te devote:

An official statement from the Anglican–Roman Catholic International Commission titled Eucharistic Doctrine, published in 1971, states that "the word transubstantiation is commonly used in the Roman Catholic Church to indicate that God acting in the Eucharist effects a change in the inner reality of the elements. The term should be seen as affirming the fact of Christ's presence and of the mysterious and radical change which takes place. In Roman Catholic theology it is not understood as explaining how the change takes place." In the smallest particle of the host or the smallest droplet from the chalice Jesus Christ himself is present: "Christ is present whole and entire in each of the species and whole and entire in each of their parts, in such a way that the breaking of the bread does not divide Christ."

Eastern Christianity

As the Disputation of the Holy Sacrament took place in the Western Church after the Great Schism, the Eastern Churches remained largely unaffected by it. The debate on the nature of "transubstantiation" in Greek Orthodoxy begins in the 17th century, with Cyril Lucaris, whose  The Eastern Confession of the Orthodox Faith was published in Latin in 1629.
The Greek term metousiosis is first used as the translation of Latin  in the Greek edition of the work, published in 1633.

The Eastern Catholic, Oriental Orthodox and Eastern Orthodox Churches, along with the Assyrian Church of the East, agree that in a valid Divine Liturgy bread and wine truly and actually become the body and blood of Christ.
In Orthodox confessions, the change is said to start during the Liturgy of Preparation and be completed during the Epiklesis. However, there are official church documents that speak of a "change" (in Greek ) or "metousiosis" of the bread and wine. "Μετ-ουσί-ωσις" (met-ousi-osis) is the Greek word used to represent the Latin word "trans-substanti-atio","The Holy Orthodox Church at the Synod of Jerusalem (date 1643 A.D.) used the word metousiosis—a change of ousia—to translate the Latin Transsubstantiatio" (Transubstantiation and the Black Rubric). as Greek "μετα-μόρφ-ωσις" (meta-morph-osis) corresponds to Latin "trans-figur-atio". Examples of official documents of the Eastern Orthodox Church that use the term "μετουσίωσις" or "transubstantiation" are the Longer Catechism of The Orthodox, Catholic, Eastern Church (question 340) and the declaration by the Eastern Orthodox Synod of Jerusalem of 1672:

The way in which the bread and wine become the body and blood of Christ has never been dogmatically defined by the Eastern Orthodox Churches. However, St Theodore the Studite writes in his treatise "On the Holy Icons": "for we confess that the faithful receive the very body and blood of Christ, according to the voice of God himself." This was a refutation of the iconoclasts, who insisted that the eucharist was the only true icon of Christ. Thus, it can be argued that by being part of the dogmatic "horos" against the iconoclast heresy, the teaching on the "real presence" of Christ in the eucharist is indeed a dogma of the Eastern Orthodox Church.

Protestantism
Anglicanism
The Anglican Church has compared the consumption of the Eucharist to an act of cannibalism, according to modern scholars who stressed the "parallel between Christian communion and cannibal feasts" and "used the  analogy to ridicule the Catholic doctrine of the transubstantiation of the Eucharist bread and wine into the body and blood of Christ". 

Elizabeth I, as part of the Elizabethan Religious Settlement, gave royal assent to the 39 Articles of Religion, which sought to distinguish Anglican from Roman Church doctrine. The Articles declared that "Transubstantiation (or the change of the substance of Bread and Wine) in the Supper of the Lord, cannot be proved by holy Writ; but is repugnant to the plain words of Scripture, overthroweth the nature of a Sacrament, and hath given occasion to many superstitions." The Elizabethan Settlement accepted the Real Presence of Christ in the Sacrament, but refused to define it, preferring to leave it a mystery. Indeed, for many years it was illegal in Britain to hold public office whilst believing in transubstantiation, as under the Test Act of 1673. Archbishop John Tillotson decried the "real barbarousness of this Sacrament and Rite of our Religion", considering it a great impiety to believe that people who attend Holy Communion "verily eat and drink the natural flesh and blood of Christ. And what can any man do more unworthily towards a Friend? How can he possibly use him more barbarously, than to feast upon his living flesh and blood?" (Discourse against Transubstantiation, London 1684, 35). In the Church of England today, clergy are required to assent that the 39 Articles have borne witness to the Christian faith.

The Eucharistic teaching labeled "receptionism", defined by Claude Beaufort Moss as "the theory that we receive the Body and Blood of Christ when we receive the bread and wine, but they are not identified with the bread and wine which are not changed", was commonly held by 16th and 17th-century Anglican theologians. It was characteristic of 17th century thought to "insist on the real presence of Christ in the Eucharist, but to profess agnosticism concerning the manner of the presence". It remained "the dominant theological position in the Church of England until the Oxford Movement in the early nineteenth century, with varying degrees of emphasis". Importantly, it is "a doctrine of the real presence" but one which "relates the presence primarily to the worthy receiver rather than to the elements of bread and wine".

Anglicans generally consider no teaching binding that, according to the Articles, "cannot be found in Holy Scripture or proved thereby", and are not unanimous in the interpretation of such passages as John 6 and 1 Corinthians 11, although all Anglicans affirm a view of the real presence of Christ in the Eucharist: some Anglicans (especially Anglo-Catholics and some other High Church Anglicans) hold to a belief in the corporeal presence while Evangelical Anglicans hold to a belief in the pneumatic presence. As with all Anglicans, Anglo-Catholics and other High Church Anglicans historically held belief in the real presence of Christ in the Eucharist but were "hostile to the doctrine of transubstantiation".

However, in the first half of the twentieth century, the Catholic Propaganda Society upheld both Article XXVIII and the doctrine of transubstantiation, stating that the 39 Articles specifically condemn a pre-Council of Trent "interpretation which was included by some under the term Transubstantiation" in which "the bread and wine were only left as a delusion of the senses after consecration"; it stated that "this Council propounded its definition after the Articles were written, and so cannot be referred to by them".

Theological dialogue with the Roman Catholic Church has produced common documents that speak of "substantial agreement" about the doctrine of the Eucharist: the ARCIC Windsor Statement of 1971, and its 1979 Elucidation. Remaining arguments can be found in the Church of England's pastoral letter: The Eucharist: Sacrament of Unity.

Lutheranism
Lutherans explicitly reject transubstantiation believing that the bread and wine remain fully bread and fully wine while also being truly the body and blood of Jesus Christ.Schuetze, A.W. (1986), Basic Doctrines of the Bible (Milwaukee: Northwestern Publishing House), Chapter 12, Article 3 Lutheran churches instead emphasize the sacramental union (not exactly the consubstantiation, as is often claimed) and believe that within the Eucharistic celebration the body and blood of Jesus Christ are objectively present "in, with, and under the forms" of bread and wine (cf. Book of Concord). They place great stress on Jesus's instructions to "take and eat", and "take and drink", holding that this is the proper, divinely ordained use of the sacrament, and, while giving it due reverence, scrupulously avoid any actions that might indicate or lead to superstition or unworthy fear of the sacrament.

In dialogue with Catholic theologians, a large measure of agreement has been reached by a group of Lutheran theologians. They recognize that "in contemporary Catholic expositions, ... transubstantiation intends to affirm the fact of Christ's presence and of the change which takes place, and is not an attempt to explain how Christ becomes present. ... [And] that it is a legitimate way of attempting to express the mystery, even though they continue to believe that the conceptuality associated with "transubstantiation" is misleading and therefore prefer to avoid the term."

Reformed churches
Classical Presbyterianism held Calvin's view of "pneumatic presence" or "spiritual feeding", a Real Presence by the Spirit for those who have faith. John Calvin "can be regarded as occupying a position roughly midway between" the doctrines of Martin Luther on one hand and Huldrych Zwingli on the other. He taught that "the thing that is signified is effected by its sign", declaring: "Believers ought always to live by this rule: whenever they see symbols appointed by the Lord, to think and be convinced that the truth of the thing signified is surely present there. For why should the Lord put in your hand the symbol of his body, unless it was to assure you that you really participate in it? And if it is true that a visible sign is given to us to seal the gift of an invisible thing, when we have received the symbol of the body, let us rest assured that the body itself is also given to us."

The Westminster Shorter Catechism summarises the teaching:

Methodism
Methodists believe in the real presence of Christ in the bread and wine (or grape juice) while, like Anglicans, Presbyterians and Lutherans, rejecting transubstantiation. According to the United Methodist Church, "Jesus Christ, who 'is the reflection of God's glory and the exact imprint of God's very being', is truly present in Holy Communion."

While upholding the view that scripture is the primary source of Church practice, Methodists also look to church tradition and base their beliefs on the early Church teachings on the Eucharist, that Christ has a real presence in the Lord's Supper. The Catechism for the use of the people called Methodists thus states that, "[in Holy Communion] Jesus Christ is present with his worshipping people and gives himself to them as their Lord and Saviour".

Others
The act of consumption of perceived flesh and blood by Catholics has been compared to the rituals of cannibal Native Americans by modern scholars of religion, both in significance and in objects of the ritual.

See also

References
Notes

Bibliography
 Burckhardt Neunheuser, "Transsubstantiation." Lexikon für Theologie und Kirche, vol. 10, cols. 311–314.
 Miri Rubin, Corpus Christi: The Eucharist in Late Medieval Culture (1991), pp. 369–419.
 Otto Semmelroth, Eucharistische Wandlung: Transsubstantation, Transfinalisation, Transsignifikation (Kevelaer: Butzon & Bercker, 1967).
 Richard J. Utz and Christine Batz, "Transubstantiation in Medieval and Early Modern Culture and Literature: An Introductory Bibliography of Critical Studies," in: Translation, Transformation, and Transubstantiation'', ed. Carol Poster and Richard Utz (Evanston: IL: Northwestern University Press, 1998), pp. 223–256."

External links

"Transubstantiation" in Catholic Encyclopedia
Pope Paul VI: Encyclical Mysterium fidei
Pope Paul VI: Credo of the People of God
Eastern Orthodox Church statements on transubstantiation/metousiosis
The Antiquity of the Doctrine of Transubstantiation

Christian terminology
Christology
Eucharist in the Catholic Church
Metamorphosis in folklore
Blood of Christ